Gli arabi nelle Gallie, ossia Il trionfo della fede (The Arabs in Gaul, or The triumph of Faith) is an opera in two acts composed by Giovanni Pacini to a libretto by Luigi Romanelli. The opera is in the opera seria genre with a libretto based on Prévot's 1822 novel Le Renégat. Gli Arabi nelle Gallie premiered on 8 March 1827 at La Scala in Milan. Between 1827 and the late 1830s it was performed throughout Italy as well as in Spain, France, and Austria. It was also the first of Pacini's operas to be performed in North America when a production was mounted in 1834 at New York's Italian Opera House.

Roles and premiere cast

Recordings
Pianist Rosemary Tuck, conductor Richard Bonynge and the English Chamber Orchestra recorded "Introduction et Variations Brillantes" sur le Marche de Gli arabi nelle Gallie for Naxos (8.573254) in 2015.

References

External links
 

Operas
1827 operas
Operas by Giovanni Pacini
Italian-language operas